Dane Dobbie (born December 1, 1986 in Elora, Ontario) is a professional lacrosse player for the San Diego Seals in the National Lacrosse League.

Dobbie comes from a lacrosse family.  His grandfather, Bob Dobbie, is a member of Canadian Lacrosse Hall of Fame and his father Larry also competed at a high level.

Dobbie won the National Lacrosse League MVP Award MVP in the 2019 NLL season.

References

1986 births
Living people
Calgary Roughnecks players
Canadian lacrosse players
Lacrosse forwards
San Diego Seals players
Sportspeople from Ontario